Ramenye is a rural locality (a village) in Ramenskoye Rural Settlement, Sheksninsky District, Vologda Oblast, Russia. The population was 33 as of 2002.

Geography 
Ramenye is located 43 km north of Sheksna (the district's administrative centre) by road. Aristovo is the nearest rural locality. ramen` shoulder in slavic languages

References 

Rural localities in Sheksninsky District